Princess Pat may refer to:
Princess Pat (song)
The Princess Pat, an operetta by Victor Herbert
Princess Pat (brand), cosmetic company
Patrice Munsel, an operatic soprano nicknamed "Princess Pat"
A cruise ship in the Princess Cruises fleet
Princess Pat Stakes, American horse race

See also: 
Princess Patricia of Connaught
Princess Patricia's Canadian Light Infantry